World Population Day is an annual event, observed on July 11 every year, which seeks to raise awareness of global population issues. The event was established by the Governing Council of the United Nations Development Programme in 1989. It was inspired by the public interest in Five Billion Day on July 11, 1987, the approximate date on which the world's population reached five billion people. World Population Day aims to increase people's awareness on various population issues such as the importance of family planning, gender equality, poverty, maternal health and human rights.

The day was suggested by Dr. K.C.Zachariah in which population reached five billion when he worked as Sr Demographer at World Bank. While press interest and general awareness in the global population surges at the increments of whole billions of people, the world population increases by 100 million approximately every 14 months. The world population was estimated at 7,400,000,000 on February 6, 2016 and reached 7,500,000,000 on April 24, 2017. The world population hit 7,700,000,000 in 2019.

In November 2020, UNFPA, together with the governments of Kenya and Denmark, convened a high-level conference in Nairobi to accelerate efforts to achieve these unmet goals. On World Population Day, advocates from around the world call on leaders, policymakers, grassroots organizers, institutions and others to help make reproductive health and rights a reality for all.

See also
Agricultural effects and population limits from peak oil
 List of countries and dependencies by population
 List of population concern organizations
 Human overpopulation
 Negative Population Growth
 United Nations Population Fund
 The Revenge of Gaia

Notes

References

External links

UN population estimates and projections
World and US Population clock

day
United Nations days
International observances
July observances